You're My Home is a 2015 Philippine romantic family drama television series directed by Jerry Lopez Sineneng, starring Richard Gomez, Dawn Zulueta, Jessy Mendiola, JC de Vera, Sam Concepcion, and Paul Salas. The series was aired on ABS-CBN's Primetime Bida evening block and worldwide via TFC from November 9, 2015 to March 23, 2016.

Originally titled as Will Never Say Goodbye, it is an intimate study on a family break-up and its possible reunion.

The series is streaming online on YouTube.

Plot
The story follows the Fontanilla family and their eldest daughter Grace (Jessy Mendiola). After many years of living in simplicity, the lives of the Fontanillas suddenly changed when Gabriel (Richard Gomez) handles the frustrated homicide case against Christian Vergara (JC de Vera), the son of a powerful senator. The young Grace turns rebellious after realizing that her father Gabriel and her mother Marian (Dawn Zulueta) had no time for their children anymore. One night, Grace tries to leave the house, and her brother Rahm runs after her, leaving Vince alone inside. The Fontanillas discovers that Vince is missing and their family will put to test. Twelve years later, the Fontanilla family faces the consequences of Vince's disappearance. Grace's parents are separated. Marian works on her own clothing line, while Gabriel finds love on Roni (Precious Lara Quigaman), a police officer who handles Vince's kidnapping case. Rahm (Sam Concepcion), at an early age, already has a son and a wife. Grace continues to move on with her life, still blaming herself for what happened to her family. Fate comes into play when Grace crosses paths with Ken (Paul Salas), and Marian learns that Ken is her missing son Vince. Things become worse as Grace falls in love with Christian, the man who got convicted for the kidnapping of her brother.

Cast and characters

Main cast

Fontanilla Family  
 Richard Gomez as Atty. Gabriel Fontanilla
 Dawn Zulueta as Marian Angeles-Fontanilla
 Jessy Mendiola as Grace A. Fontanilla-Vergara
 Belle Mariano as young Grace 
 Sam Concepcion as Rahm A. Fontanilla
 Bugoy Cariño as young Rahm 
 Paul Salas as Vince A. Fontanilla / Kennedy "Ken" A. Cabanero
 Raikko Mateo as young Vince 
 Mika dela Cruz as Jennifer - Vince's bestfriend . later in the series she fell in love with Vince and has been his girlfriend.
 Precious Lara Quigaman as SPO3 Veronica "Roni" Tesnado - Gabriel's fiancee but didn't end up to marry each other.
 Assunta de Rossi as Jackie Apostol-Cabanero - Ken / Vince's foster mom.

Vergara Family  
 JC de Vera as Christian Vergara
 Tonton Gutierrez as Victor Vergara
 Jobelle Salvador as Teresa Vergara

Supporting cast 
 Claire Ruiz as Clarisse Velez-Fontanilla - Rahm's wife .
 Rowell Santiago as Mike Macaraig
 Elisse Joson as Alexis Madrigal
 Peewee O'Hara as Nanay Dolores
 Minnie Aguilar as Sally
 Marina Benipayo as Althea Asuncion
 Evangeline Pascual as Cassandra
 Hyubs Azarcon as Ramon Tesnado
 Denise Joaquin as Didith
 Angelo Ilagan as Jawo
 Crispin Pineda as Ely Marasigan
 EJ Jallorina as Ken's friend
 Bryan Homecillo as Ken's friend
 Miggy Campbell as Yuan

Guest cast 
 Kyline Alcantara as Janice
 Chinggoy Alonzo as Atty. Ferdinand Vasquez
 Tony Mabesa as Mr. Reyes
 Jong Cuenco as Atty. Manlapuz
 Minco Fabregas as Sandro
 Josh Ivan Morales as Franco de Villa
 Janice Jurado as Mrs. Josefa Jamillano
 Michael Roy Jornales as Christian's friend
 Junjun Quintana as Ryan Montes
 Rufa Mi as Lydia
 Rubi Rubi as Chona
 Negi as Georgette
 Mitoy Yonting as Atty. Delfin del Rosario
 Lui Manansala as Mercy
 Prince Stefan
 Kim Molina
 Dionne Monsanto as Mildred de Villa
 Maila Gumila as Fely
 Devon Seron as Beauty
 CX Navarro as Tikboy
 Arnold Reyes as Santiago
 Jef Gaitan as Maureen Enriquez
 Rochelle Barrameda as Mrs. Madrigal
 Jon Lucas as Lance
 Paco Evangelista as Lito San Pablo
 Ronnie Quizon as Mando Dimalanta
 Zeppi Borromeo as Roel Dimalanta
 Buboy Garovillo as Cesar Acosta
 Glenda Garcia as Anna Acosta
 Chienna Filomeno as Felicity Flores
 Kyra Custodio as Drunk woman
 Angelica Yap as Lourdes Marcelo
 Nina Ricci Alagao
 Vangie Labalan as Oda Tilay
 Bangs Garcia as Emma
 Fifth Solomon as Barbie
 Dante Ponce as Mark
 Rustica Carpio as Elvie
 Ruby Ruiz as Wilma
 Leandro Baldemor as Jose

Ratings

International broadcast

See also
List of programs broadcast by ABS-CBN
List of ABS-CBN drama series
List of programs broadcast by Jeepney TV

References

External links

ABS-CBN drama series
2015 Philippine television series debuts
2016 Philippine television series endings
Television series by Star Creatives
Filipino-language television shows
Television shows set in the Philippines